Grebbestads IF is a Swedish football club located in Grebbestad.

Background
In 2012 Grebbestads IF won Division 4 Bohuslän/Dalsland which is the sixth tier of Swedish football. In 2013 they played – and won – the third division Northwest Gotaland. Currently (2017) they play in the second division which is the fourth tier of Swedish football. They play their home matches at the Siljevi in Grebbestad.

The club is affiliated to Bohusläns Fotbollförbund. Grebbestads IF have competed in the Svenska Cupen on 14 occasions and have played 29 matches in the competition.

Season to season

Footnotes

External links
  of Grebbestads IF

Football clubs in Västra Götaland County
Association football clubs established in 1922
1922 establishments in Sweden